A total solar eclipse occurred on February 25, 1952. A solar eclipse occurs when the Moon passes between Earth and the Sun, thereby totally or partly obscuring the image of the Sun for a viewer on Earth. A total solar eclipse occurs when the Moon's apparent diameter is larger than the Sun's, blocking all direct sunlight, turning day into darkness. Totality occurs in a narrow path across Earth's surface, with the partial solar eclipse visible over a surrounding region thousands of kilometres wide.
The path of totality crossed Africa, the Middle East, and Asia.

Related eclipses

Solar eclipses of 1950–1953

Saros 139

Metonic series

Notes

References

 Solar eclipse of February 25, 1952 in Russia

1952 02 25
1952 in science
1952 02 25
February 1952 events